Miyamae (written: 宮前) is a Japanese surname. Notable people with the surname include:

, member of the Japanese idol girl group SKE48
, Japanese pop singer
, Japanese Zen Buddhist rōshi

See also
Miyamae-ku, Kawasaki, a ward of Kawasaki in Kanagawa Prefecture, Japan
Miyamae Station, a railway station in Wakayama Prefecture, Japan

Japanese-language surnames